The First Lady of the Republic of the Congo (French: Première Dame de la République du Congo)  is the title attributed to the wife of the president of the Republic of the Congo. The country's current first lady is Antoinette Sassou Nguesso, wife of President Denis Sassou Nguesso, who had held the position since October 25, 1997. There has been no first gentleman of the Republic of the Congo to date.

List of first ladies of the Republic of the Congo

References

Congo, Republic of the
Politics of the Republic of the Congo